John Usher (April 27, 1648 – September 1726) was an English colonial administrator.  Born in Boston, he served as treasurer of the Dominion of New England from 1686 until the Boston Revolt of 1689.  After the revolt, dominion governor Sir Edmund Andros was confined in Usher's home.  Usher was twice lieutenant governor of the Province of New Hampshire (1692–1697 and 1702–1715).  As lieutenant governor, he frequently held the reins of power, since the governors (his father-in-law Samuel Allen, and Joseph Dudley) were often absent from the province.  His rule was unpopular.  He died in Medford, Massachusetts in 1722.

References

1648 births
1726 deaths
Politicians from Boston
Colonial governors of New Hampshire
Dominion of New England